Acanthofrontia lithosiana is a moth of the subfamily Arctiinae. It was described by George Hampson in 1910. It is found in Kenya.

References

Endemic moths of Kenya
Moths described in 1910
Erebid moths of Africa
Lithosiini